Mehmet Elkatmış (born 14 January 1947, Nevşehir) is a Justice and Development Party (AKP) politician. He was chair of the parliamentary Susurluk Commission which investigated the 1996 Susurluk scandal. He was chair of the parliamentary Human Rights Commission in 2005. He was first elected to parliament in 1991.

References 

1947 births
Living people
People from Nevşehir
Welfare Party politicians
Virtue Party politicians
Justice and Development Party (Turkey) politicians
Members of the 22nd Parliament of Turkey
Members of the 21st Parliament of Turkey
Members of the 20th Parliament of Turkey